Mirko Szewczuk, was born Volodymyr Szewczuk (born 20 September 1919 in Vienna; died 31 May 1957 in Hamburg, Germany) was a German cartoonist of Austrian-Ukrainian origin.

Szewczuk was born in 1919 in Vienna, Austria. From 1926-1938, he attended the elementary school and the Realgymnasium in Vienna. In 1939, at the age of 20, he became a soldier and remained so until the end of the Second World War.

In 1941, he received an education as a draughtsman at a press propaganda company of the Wehrmacht. He was employed in 1942 as a press cartoonist for the caricature agency Die Politische Zeichnung - Interpress

Between 1946-49, he studied at the National Arts School of Hamburg and was a cartoonist for the weekly German newspaper "Die Zeit". He then transferred to the daily newspaper Die Welt, where he worked until his death in Hamburg in 1957.

Austrian people of Ukrainian descent
Austrian emigrants to Germany
Austrian military personnel of World War II
Artists from Vienna
1919 births
1957 deaths
German caricaturists
German editorial cartoonists